Roggentin is a village and a former municipality in the Mecklenburgische Seenplatte district, in Mecklenburg-Vorpommern, Germany. Since 25 May 2014, it is part of the town Mirow.

References 

Former municipalities in Mecklenburg-Western Pomerania